Olof Emil Rolf Franksson (29 August 1900 – 14 September 1971) was a Swedish long jumper. He competed at the 1920 Summer Olympics and finished sixth.

References

1900 births
1971 deaths
Swedish male long jumpers
Olympic athletes of Sweden
Athletes (track and field) at the 1920 Summer Olympics
20th-century Swedish people